ICTV (in full, International Commercial Television) is a privately held TV channel in Ukraine. Its coverage area allows it to be received by 56.6% of the Ukrainian population, making the channel the fourth in the nation in terms of coverage (trailing the state-controlled UT1 and privately held Inter and 1+1), and third (well ahead of UT1) by the viewers' ratings.

The channel is owned by several business structures connected to the Ukrainian businessman Viktor Pinchuk. It first went on-air on 15 June 1992, and since 1995 it has broadcast 24 hours a day.

On November 11, 2009 "ICTV" joined the media holding "Starlight Media", which also includes TV channels "New Channel", "STB", "OTse TV", "M1", "M2". Related to the Crimean crises 2014 ICTV broadcasts in Sevastopol ended on 9 March 2014, 14:30 o'clock East European time.

Criticism 

Since 2014 ICTV channel was criticised for broadcasting Russian serials. According to the results of monitoring made by "Boycott Russian Films" campaign activists in September this channel was broadcasting 7 hours and 40 minutes of Russian content per day. At the end of month the part of Russian origin content took 43% of all broadcasting time. Also, according to activists, ICTV shows almost the biggest amount of serials about Russian law enforcement and army.

Programming
 Friends
 Bones
 House
 Nash Bridges
 Tru Calling
 Dog
 Nyuhach

Films
 The Matrix
 Shallow Hal
 X-Men
 The Powerpuff Girls Movie
 The Day After Tomorrow
 Office Space
 Wayne's World

References

External links
ICTV website

 
Television stations in Ukraine
Ukrainian brands
Television channels and stations established in 1992